Benjamin Gronow (10 March 1887 – 24 November 1967) was a Welsh dual-code international rugby union, and professional rugby league footballer who played in the 1900s, 1910s and 1920s. At club level Gronow played under the union code for Bridgend RFC, county rugby for Glamorgan, and international rugby for Wales. He was often used as a utility forward. When he switched to professional league rugby he represented Huddersfield (two spells), Grenfell, Batley and Featherstone Rovers (captain) (Heritage No. 82), while at representative level, Gronow played for Great Britain and Wales. His playing position varied under the league code being used as a goal-kicking forward (prior to the specialist positions of), during the era of contested scrums.

Playing career

While playing rugby union at Bridgend RFC, in 1910 Gronow won four caps for Wales. Gronow won eight caps for Wales under the league code, between 1910 and 1923 while playing for Huddersfield. Gronow was also capped for the Great Britain rugby league team while at Huddersfield, in 1911 against Australia (2 matches), and after being selected for the 1920 Great Britain Lions tour of Australasia, against Australia (2 matches), and New Zealand (3 matches).

Ben Gronow played as a forward, i.e. number 8, in Huddersfield's 2–8 defeat by Wakefield Trinity in the 1910 Yorkshire County Cup Final during the 1910–11 season at Headingley Rugby Stadium, Leeds on Saturday 3 December 1910, played as a forward, i.e. number 10, and scored 4-goals in the 18–8 victory over Dewsbury in the 1919 Yorkshire County Cup Final during the 1918–19 season at Headingley Rugby Stadium, Leeds on Saturday 17 May 1919, played as a forward, i.e. number 10, and scored 3-goals in the 24–5 victory over Leeds in the 1919 Yorkshire County Cup Final during the 1919–20 season at Thrum Hall, Halifax on Saturday 29 November 1919, and played as a forward, i.e. number 8, and scored a goal in the 4–10 defeat by Hull F.C. in the 1923 Yorkshire County Cup Final during the 1923–24 season at Headingley Rugby Stadium, Leeds on Saturday 24 November 1923.

Gronow also played at least one game for the Other Nationalities team, on 5 February 1921 against England. The game was notable for the Other Nationalities side being entirely composed of Welsh players; but despite approaches to have the game recognised as a 'Wales' v England encounter the rugby league authorities refused to accept the request. Gronow became one of less than twenty-five Welshmen to have scored more than 1000-points in their rugby league career.

Gronow was selected for Great Britain while at Huddersfield for the 1924 Great Britain Lions tour of Australia and New Zealand, he did not play in any of the Test matches on this tour.

In 1925 Gronow became the first British player to move down under when he went from Huddersfield to Grenfell, New South Wales as their coach but returned two years later.

Ben Gronow made his début for Featherstone Rovers on Wednesday 13 March 1929.

Ben Gronow appears to have scored no drop-goals (or field-goals as they are currently known in Australasia), but prior to the 1974–75 season all goals, whether; conversions, penalties, or drop-goals, scored 2-points, consequently prior to this date drop-goals were often not explicitly documented, therefore '0' drop-goals may indicate drop-goals not recorded, rather than no drop-goals scored. In addition, prior to the 1949–50 season, the archaic field-goal was also still a valid means of scoring points.

Coaching career
Gronow was the coach for rugby union team Morley R.F.C. in the 1930s, however when a history of the club was produced some years later, due to his previous rugby league associations, he was identified as 'unknown' in a team photograph.

References

External links
!Great Britain Statistics at englandrl.co.uk (statistics currently missing due to not having appeared for both Great Britain, and England)
Statistics at bridgendravens.co.uk
(archived by archive.is) The Ben Gronow Mystery

1887 births
1967 deaths
Batley Bulldogs players
Bridgend RFC players
Dual-code rugby internationals
Featherstone Rovers captains
Featherstone Rovers players
Glamorgan County RFC players
Great Britain national rugby league team players
Huddersfield Giants players
Other Nationalities rugby league team players
Rugby league forwards
Rugby league players from Bridgend
Rugby union players from Bridgend
Wales international rugby union players
Wales national rugby league team players
Welsh rugby league players
Welsh rugby union coaches
Welsh rugby union players